Snoopy and His Friends is the third album by the Ocala, Florida group The Royal Guardsmen.

The group is best known for their hit recording of "Snoopy vs. the Red Baron", which was first released in 1966 as a 45 rpm record single (it reached No. 2 in the US and No. 8 in the UK) and had previously been released as the title track to their debut album; both it and its follow-up "The Return of the Red Baron" were re-released on this album. The song "Snoopy's Christmas", introduced on this album, is still played somewhat during the Christmas season. All three songs constitute side A of Snoopy and His Friends.

Two singles were released from the album: the aforementioned "Snoopy's Christmas" and "I Say Love." The latter, a non-Snoopy-themed song, reached number 72 on the Billboard Hot 100.

Charles Schulz, creator of the Peanuts comic strip (and the Snoopy character), drew the album artwork. He agreed to contribute artwork and allow the group to release the record in exchange for a cut of the royalties.

Track listing
 Side 1
 The Story of Snoopy Vs. the Red Baron
 The Story of the Return of the Red Baron
 The Story of Snoopy's Christmas
 Side 2
 I Say Love
 Down Behind the Lines
 It's Sopwith Camel Time
 So Right
 Airplane Song (My Airplane)
 It Kinda Looks Like Christmas

1967 albums
Peanuts music
The Royal Guardsmen albums
Laurie Records albums
Novelty albums